Kent Smith (1907–1985) was an American actor.

Kent Smith may also refer to:

Kent Smith (American politician) (born 1966), American politician in the Ohio House of Representatives
Kent Smith (Canadian politician), Canadian politician in the Nova Scotia House of Assembly
Kent Smith (producer), Australian cinematographer and film producer

See also
List of people with surname Smith
Smith (disambiguation)
Smith (surname)